Lady Uiseongbuwon of the Uiseong Hong clan was the daughter of Hong-Yu who became the 27th wife of Taejo of Goryeo. Her father was one of the helper and supporter for Wang Geon in established the new Goryeo dynasty along with Sin Sung-gyeom (신숭겸), Bak Ji-gyeom (복지겸) and Bae Hyeon-gyeong (배현경), also they all defeated Gung Ye. Hong-Yu also served Taejo as his Three Grand Masters (삼중대광) and with Taejo, she had a son, Grand Prince Uiseongbuwon who later married Lady Ryu, 3rd daughter of Queen Jeongdeok.

References

Year of birth unknown
Year of death unknown
Consorts of Taejo of Goryeo
People from Uiseong County